The Penobscot and Kennebec Railroad (P&K) is a historic U.S. railroad which operated in Maine.

The Penobscot and Kennebec Railroad Co. received a charter on April 5, 1845, and built a line between Bangor, Maine and Waterville, Maine.  At Waterville the P&K connected with the Androscoggin and Kennebec Railroad (A&K).  At North Maine Junction, the A&K connected with the Bangor and Piscataquis Railroad.

In 1845 the year that the P&K was chartered, a law was enacted permitting both the P&K and A&K to consolidate under a new name.  The legislation was not acceptable to both companies, thus the A&K was chartered in 1847.  The P&K and A&K did not merge until after the contentious section of the previous merger legislation was repealed on September 9, 1862.  The following month on October 28, 1862, the A&K and P&K merged to form the Maine Central Railroad.

Defunct Maine railroads
Predecessors of the Maine Central Railroad
Railway companies established in 1845
Railway companies disestablished in 1862
5 ft 6 in gauge railways in the United States
American companies established in 1845
American companies disestablished in 1862